Taiwanofungus is a fungal genus of unknown familial placement in the order Polyporales. The genus contains two species: the type, Taiwanofungus camphoratus, and T. salmoneus. Taiwanofungus  was circumscribed by Chinese mycologists in 2004. T. camphoratus is a medicinal fungus that is found in Taiwan, where it grows on the endemic tree species Cinnamomum kanehirae. It was first described in 1990 by Mu Zang and Ching-Hua Su as a species of Ganoderma. T. salmoneus, originally placed in Antrodia, was validly added to the genus in 2012.

References

Fungi described in 2004
Polyporales
Polyporales genera
Taxa named by Yu-Cheng Dai